The Iraqi Transitional Government was the government of Iraq from May 3, 2005, when it replaced the Iraqi Interim Government, until May 20, 2006, when it was replaced by a permanent government.

On April 28 it was approved by the transitional Iraqi National Assembly, which had been elected in January 2005. It operated under the Law of Administration for the State of Iraq for the Transitional Period, and its main functions were to draft a permanent Constitution of Iraq and to form a transitional government.

Organization

Executive
Although the President is the chief of military and head of state, the Prime Minister is the head of government who exercises most executive powers. The President and both deputies (collective the Presidency Council of Iraq) are elected by the Assembly with a two-thirds majority. They then propose the Prime Minister from the largest party, who must also be approved with a two-thirds majority; the Prime Minister then proposes the Council of Ministers, who must be approved with a two-thirds majority.

The current Council of Ministers was sworn in on May 3 but several key posts were left vacant. Six new ministers were approved to fill vacant positions on 8 May, one of whom rejected his position saying he had not been consulted.

{| cellpadding=5 cellspacing=0 border=2
|-
!colspan=1 bgcolor="#CCCCCC"|Position
!colspan=1 bgcolor="#CCCCCC"|
|-
|President
|Jalal Talabani
|-
| Vice Presidents 
|Adil Abdul Mahdi  Ghazi al-Yawer
|-
|Prime Minister
|Ibrahim al Jaafari
|-
|Deputy Prime Ministers
|Ahmed ChalabiRuz Nuri ShawisAbid Mutlak al-Jubouri(vacant)
|-
|Interior Minister
|Bayan Baqir Solagh 
|-
|Foreign Minister
|Hoshyar Zebari
|-
|Defence Minister
|Saadoun al-Dulaimi
|-
|Oil Minister
|Ibrahim Bahr al-Uloum
|-
|Electricity Minister
|Mohsen Shlash
|-
|Minister of Planning and Development Co-operation
|Barham Salih 
|-
|Higher Education Minister
|Sami al-Mudhaffar
|-
|Minister of Municipalities and Public Works
|Nisrin Barwari
|-
|Telecommunications Minister
|Juwan Fouad Masum
|-
|Finance Minister
|Ali Abdul-Amir Allawi 
|-
|Minister of Water Resources
|Abdul-Latif Rashid 
|-
|Minister of Environment
|Narmin Othman
|-
|Trade Minister
|Abdel-Karim Mahoud al-Mohammedawi 
|-
|Transport Minister
|Salam al-Maliki
|-
|Minister of Labour and Social Affairs
|Idris Hadi
|-
|Human Rights MinisterNarmin Othman (acting)Hashim al-Shible rejected the post after he had been approved by parliament
|-
|Health Minister
|Abdel Muttalib Mohammed Ali
|-
|Minister of Construction and Housing
|Jasim Mohammed Jaafar
|-
|Education Minister
|Abdel Falah Hassan
|-
|Agriculture Minister
|Ali al-Bahadili
|-
|Justice Minister
|Abdel Hussein Shandal
|-
|Culture Minister
|Nuri Farhan al-Rawi
|-
|Minister of Science and Technology
|Basimah Yusuf Butrus
|-
|Minister of Displacement and Migration
|Suhaylah Abd-Jaafar
|-
|Minister of Youth and Sports
|Talib Aziz Zayni
|-
|Minister of Industry
|Usama al-Najafi
|-
|Minister of State for National Security Affairs
|Abdul Karim al-Anizi
|-
|Minister of State for Governorate Affairs
|Saad Nayif Mujhim al-Hardan
|-
|Minister of State for Civil Society Affairs
|Ala Habib Kazim
|-
|Minister of State for Women's Affairs
|Azhar Abdel Karim al-Shaikhli
|-
|Minister of State for Tourism and Antiquities
|Hashim al-Hashimi
|-
|Minister of State for National Assembly Affairs
|Safa al-Din Mohammed al-Safi
|}

Legislative
President of National Assembly Hajim al-Hassani
Deputy President Hussain al-Shahristani
Deputy President Aref Taifour 
National Assembly

Judicial
Higher Judicial Council
Federal Supreme Court
Court of Cassation
Courts of Appeal
Central Criminal Court

References
ANNEX TO THE LAW FOR THE ADMINISTRATION OF IRAQ IN THE TRANSITIONAL PERIOD Air University  of United States Air Force

Cabinets of Iraq
Provisional governments
2005 establishments in Iraq
2006 disestablishments in Iraq